Burdett Coutts (1919–2016) was a Singaporean field hockey player.

Burdett-Coutts may refer to:
Angela Burdett-Coutts, 1st Baroness Burdett-Coutts (1814–1906), English philanthropist
William Burdett-Coutts (1851–1921), American-born British politician
William Burdett-Coutts (promoter), Zimbabwean theatrical promoter

See also 
Burdett (disambiguation)
Coutts (disambiguation)